The 2005 Individual Speedway Junior World Championship was the 29th edition of the World motorcycle speedway Under-21 Championships.

The final was won by Krzysztof Kasprzak of the Poland.

World final
September 17, 2005
 Wiener Neustadt, OAMTC Zweigverein
 only 12 heats
order:
1-2 place: coin flipping, because Suchánek to not agree to do race-off heat
3-4 place: Lindgren have two "3"; Hlib only one "3"

References

2005
World I J
Speedway
Speedway competitions in Austria